The Johnston County School District serves Johnston County, North Carolina.  Currently, Johnston County has 46 schools, which serve over 35,000 students, and experiences a 4% increase in enrollment yearly.

Elementary schools
Benson Elementary School, Benson
Cleveland Elementary School, Cleveland
Cooper Academy, Clayton^
Corinth-Holders Elementary School, Archer Lodge
Dixon Road Elementary School, Willow Spring
East Clayton Elementary School, Clayton
Four Oaks Elementary School, Four Oaks
Glendale-Kenly Elementary School, Kenly
McGee's Crossroads Elementary School, McGee's Crossroads
Meadow School (K-8), Benson
Micro Elementary School, Micro
Pine Level Elementary School, Pine Level
Polenta Elementary School, Cleveland
Powhatan Elementary School, Clayton
Princeton Elementary School, Princeton
River Dell Elementary School, Archer Lodge
Riverwood Elementary School, Clayton
Selma Elementary School, Selma
South Smithfield Elementary School, Smithfield
West Clayton Elementary School, Clayton
West Smithfield Elementary School, Smithfield
Westview Elementary School, Cleveland
Wilson's Mills Elementary School, Wilson's Mills
^Name changed from Cooper Elementary in 2017

Middle schools
Archer Lodge Middle School, Archer Lodge
Benson Middle School, Benson
Clayton Middle School, Clayton
Cleveland Middle School, Cleveland
Four Oaks Middle School, Four Oaks
Innovation Academy at South Campus, Smithfield
McGee's Crossroads Middle School, McGee's Crossroads
Meadow School (K-8), Benson
North Johnston Middle School, Micro
Princeton Middle/High School (6-12), Princeton
Riverwood Middle School, Clayton
Selma Middle School, Selma
Smithfield Middle School, Smithfield
Swift Creek Middle School, Clayton

High schools
Clayton High School, Clayton
Cleveland High School, Cleveland
Corinth Holders High School, Wendell
North Johnston High School, Kenly
Princeton High School (6-12), Princeton
Smithfield-Selma High School, Smithfield
South Johnston High School, Four Oaks
West Johnston High School, Benson

Special schools
Johnston County also has two special high schools on the campus of Johnston Community College and one on the campus of Clayton High School:
Johnston County Career and Technical Leadership Academy
Johnston County Early College Academy
Johnston County Middle College High School

External links
Official website

Education in Johnston County, North Carolina
School districts in North Carolina